Naked Conversations: How Blogs Are Changing the Way Businesses Talk with Customers, is a book written by Robert Scoble  and Shel Israel, published in 2006 by John Wiley & Sons.  The book is about how blogs, bloggers and the blogosphere is changing how businesses communicate with their consumers and other stakeholders.  The authors discuss more than 50 case studies of companies and business leaders, some that have been helped and hurt by their interactions with bloggers and encourages businesses about the best and most successful ways of blogging.

References

2006 non-fiction books
Books about the Internet
Wiley (publisher) books